The Hamp Williams Building is a historic commercial building at 500-504 Ouachita Avenue in Hot Springs, Arkansas. It is a two-story masonry structure, built out of granite and tile, and stands across from the Garland County Courthouse. Its main facade is divided into three storefronts, and has a tile mansard roof with a deep bracketed cornice. It was built in 1920 to house the Hamp Williams Automobile Company, and was at the time of its construction one of the city's largest commercial and retail spaces.

The building was listed on the National Register of Historic Places in 2007.

See also
National Register of Historic Places listings in Garland County, Arkansas

References

Commercial buildings on the National Register of Historic Places in Arkansas
Renaissance Revival architecture in Arkansas
Buildings and structures in Hot Springs, Arkansas
National Register of Historic Places in Hot Springs, Arkansas
Commercial buildings completed in 1920